Califa may refer to:

 Califa, a California library consortium, see List of Library consortia
 Califa, California, in Madera County
 CALIFA, the Calar Alto Legacy Integral Field Area Survey, an astronomical project of the Calar Alto Observatory
 Caliph, leader and ruler of a caliphate

See also
 Calafia (disambiguation)
 Kalifa (disambiguation)
 Khalifa (disambiguation)